David Thomas Howard (born August 31, 1987) is a former American football defensive tackle. After playing college football for Brown Bears, he was drafted in the seventh round of the 2010 NFL Draft by the Tennessee Titans.

Howard was also a member of the Oakland Raiders, Seattle Seahawks, and Jacksonville Jaguars.

College career
In four seasons at Brown, Howard played in 33 games and totaled 74 tackles, 13 sacks, 15 quarterback pressures, 25.5 tackles for loss and four forced fumbles.

Professional career

Tennessee Titans
Howard was drafted by the Titans with the 241st overall pick in the 2010 NFL Draft and later signed a 4-year contract with the team. He was released September 4, 2010.

Oakland Raiders
Howard was signed to the Oakland Raiders' practice squad on December 15, 2010, and remained there until the end of the season.

Seattle Seahawks
On August 20, 2011, Howard signed with the Seattle Seahawks. He was released during final roster cuts on September 3, 2011.

Jacksonville Jaguars
The Jacksonville Jaguars signed Howard on April 16, 2012. He was waived on April 30, 2012.

References

External links
Seattle Seahawks bio
Oakland Raiders bio
Tennessee Titans bio
Brown Bears bio

1987 births
Living people
American football defensive tackles
People from Columbia, Maryland
Players of American football from Maryland
Brown Bears football players
Tennessee Titans players
Seattle Seahawks players
Sportspeople from the Baltimore metropolitan area
Oakland Raiders players
Jacksonville Jaguars players